Nshyugyezi Hydroelectric Power Station, also Nsongezi Hydroelectric Power Station, is a planned  hydroelectric power station in Uganda. The power project is under development, as of September 2017.

Location
The power station would be located on the Kagera River, along Uganda's International border with the Republic of Tanzania.

Overview
Nshugyezi Hydropower Station is a mini-hydropower plant, with a planned capacity of 39 megawatts.

Construction costs
As at December 2017, the exact construction costs were unknown. This project has received partial funding from Norfund.

Ownership
In July 2015, the development rights for this power project were transferred to Maji Power Limited, the Ugandan subsidiary of Berkeley Energy. Also, Norfund’s share in the Kikagati and Nshugyezi project companies was reduced to 30 percent.

See also

Uganda Power Stations
Africa Dams

References

External links
 Approximate Location of Nshungyezi Power Station At Google Maps
 Bugoye plant operating in Uganda

Hydroelectric power stations in Uganda
Isingiro District
Western Region, Uganda
Proposed hydroelectric power stations
Proposed renewable energy power stations in Uganda